Gillian 'Gill' Dawn Miles is a former Welsh international lawn bowler.

Bowls career
She was born in 1941 and won the bronze medal in the fours with Ann Sutherland, Pam John and Nina Shipperlee at the 2002 Commonwealth Games in Manchester.

She still bowls for the Cardiff Bowling Club in age group events. Gill is also a former Welsh captain and her mother Mavis Bellamy was also capped by Wales.

References

Living people
1941 births
Bowls players at the 2002 Commonwealth Games
Commonwealth Games medallists in lawn bowls
Welsh female bowls players
Commonwealth Games bronze medallists for Wales
Medallists at the 2002 Commonwealth Games